Rohat  also known as Rohit is a town and a tehsil in Pali district, Rajasthan, India. Rohat is located on Jodhpur-Pali route NH 62
Rohat is a good place for Blackbucks and Siberian cranes .

Demographics

According to Census 2001, population of Rohat tehsil is 102,599, where male are 52,215 and female are 50,384.

Rohat as a tehsil
Rohat tehsil is in the north west of the Pali district sharing the border with Jodhpur district and Barmer district. Area of the tehsil is about 1407.75 km2. There are 79 villages in the tehsil under 23 Gram Panchayats.

Rohat tehsil have a good number of population of cattle (2,60,555 in 1997) also like camel, goat, sheep, buffalo

References 

 Rohat population
 Rohat Coordinates

Villages in Pali district